Malmö is a Swedish city in the Malmö Municipality or the City of Malmö.

Malmö or Malmo may also refer to:

Malmo, Nebraska, a village in the US
Malmoe, Queensland, a locality in the North Burnett Region, Queensland, Australia
SS Malmö, a number of ships
Malmö FF, a football team